Puerto Rico Highway 238 (PR-238)  is an east–west bypass located southeast of downtown Coamo, Puerto Rico.

Major intersections

See also

 List of highways numbered 238

References

External links
 

238
Coamo, Puerto Rico